The 1944 United States elections was held on November 7, 1944, taking place just a month after the Allies liberated Paris in World War II. President Franklin D. Roosevelt was re-elected to an unprecedented fourth term, while the Democrats retained their majorities in both chambers of Congress.

The elections of 1944 were a referendum on President Roosevelt's execution of the war, and with the United States and the allies delivering successful results against the Axis powers, the American public rallied around the President and his party.

President 

Seeking a record fourth term, Democratic incumbent President Franklin D. Roosevelt was challenged by Republican Governor Thomas E. Dewey of New York. Dewey ran an energetic campaign, seeking a smaller government and a less-regulated economy as the end of World War II seemed in sight. Roosevelt dominated the electoral college for the fourth straight election and won the popular vote by seven and a half points, his lowest margin. Roosevelt easily won his party's nomination, while Dewey took the Republican nomination on the first ballot over Ohio Governor John W. Bricker, who would be nominated for vice president. Future president Harry S. Truman won the Democratic nomination for vice president, replacing Henry A. Wallace on the Democratic ballot.

United States House of Representatives

The Democrats picked up a net gain of 20 seats in the House, increasing their majority, 242–191 (not included are two seats held by minor parties).

United States Senate

Although the Democrats suffered a net loss of one seat to the Republicans, they still kept a large majority in the Senate.

References

 
1944